This article lists 35 mm films and videos that were banned in Chile between 1972 and 2001.

Background
In 1974, under General Augusto Pinochet's dictatorship (1973–1990), a decree was issued that allowed the banning of films in Chile. Over the years, 1,092 films were banned. The Chilean film censorship system remained largely unchanged until November 1996 when United International Pictures requested a rating for The Last Temptation of Christ, which was ultimately approved for audiences over 18. However, an ultra-conservative religious group filed an injunction to reverse the decision, and in June 1997, the Supreme Court banned the film. In September 1997, a civil liberties group took the case to the Inter-American Commission on Human Rights, which ruled in February 2001 that Chile was in violation of the American Convention on Human Rights and should lift the ban on the film and modify its legislation to comply with the convention. In August 2001, a constitutional reform eliminated film censorship, and the film appeared in video stores. In January 2003, a new film rating law was published, and the film was given an "over 18" rating. It finally premiered on March 13, 2003, at a theater in Santiago.

35 mm films
The following is a list of 35 mm films and videos that were banned in Chile between 1972 and 2001.

Videos

References

Chile
Cinema of Chile
Censorship in Chile
Chile
Banned
Inter-American Court of Human Rights cases
 List Chile